Sidney Fuller (16 April 1888 – 3 August 1966) was a South African cricketer. He played in eight first-class matches from 1906/07 to 1934/35.

References

External links
 

1888 births
1966 deaths
South African cricketers
Border cricketers
Cricketers from East London, Eastern Cape